(Spanish for "Worthy Chile") is a Chilean political coalition of left-wing parties with a marxist–leninist, ecologist, regionalist and humanist ideology.

The political alliance was created under the name Unity for Change after the victory of the conservative coalition Chile Vamos in the 2017 general election.

Composition 

The coalition consisted of the Communist Party of Chile (PCCh), a former party of the New Majority. In addition, Chile Digno also included the Progressive Party and the Social Green Regionalist Federation. The Progressive Party left the coalition in 2020.

See also 
 List of political parties in Chile
 New Majority (Chile)
 Chile Vamos
 Progressive Convergence
 Broad Front

References

Political parties established in 2019
2019 establishments in Chile
Left-wing political party alliances
Political party alliances in Chile